Ján Brezina (1 January 1917 in Východná – 4 August 1997 in Bratislava) was a Slovak poet, literary historian and theoretician.

He was an employee of the Slovak Academy of Sciences since 1943, of the Slovak Matica and from 1970 - 1973 director of the Institute for Literal History of the Slovak Academy of Sciences.

Works
Poems:
Nikdy sa nestretnem (I will never meet)
Okrídlený deň (A day with wings)
Nočné bdenie (Night waking)
Horúcou linkou (By a hotline)

Literary history:
Slovenská poézia v revolučných rokoch 1917-1922 (Slovak poetry in the revolutionary years 1917-1922)

Slovak writers
1917 births
1997 deaths
Comenius University alumni
People from Liptovský Mikuláš District